Storybound is a podcast created, produced, and hosted by Jude Brewer, with original music composed for each episode. The show is a collaboration between Lit Hub and The Podglomerate podcast network, featuring household names and Pulitzer Prize winning authors alongside relatively unknown bands, singer-songwriters, and composers. Season 1 debuted on December 3, 2019. Inspired from Brewer's Storytellers Telling Stories, Storybound surpassed a million downloads in its first year, following up with seasons 2 and 3, the latter of which has been recognized for experimental cross-genre music compositions with sampling created and arranged by Brewer.

Series overview

Regarding the crafting of each episode, Brewer likened the relationship between literature and music as the conceptual evolution of a live reading, also adding how "beats or time signatures or chord progressions" allow listeners to feel a story's forward progression: "There's something subtle in your mind telling you, 'I'm going to get past this moment.'"

Storybound is noted for pairing award-winning and bestselling writers with comparatively unknown musicians, an idea spun out of Brewer's initial conception for Storytellers Telling Stories. Brewer had alluded to an uncertain future for Storytellers Telling Stories in as early as February 2019. Storybound was announced later that year at a live performance for the Literary Arts Portland Book Festival pre-show, Lit Crawl, where they also announced their sponsorship with Powell's Books.

Season 1 included critically acclaimed and bestselling authors such as Mitch Albom, Lidia Yuknavitch, Matt Gallagher, Kim Barnes, Adelle Waldman, Diksha Basu, Nathan Hill, Caitlin Doughty, Mitchell S. Jackson as well as a story told by Jack Rhysider, creator of the popular podcast Darknet Diaries. Seasons 2 and 3 continued this trend, expanding outside of its primary literary/memoir focus, featuring science fiction author Charlie Jane Anders, essayist Soraya Nadia McDonald, comic book writer Mark Russell, fiction writer Junot Díaz, and Pulitzer Prize winning critic, Soraya Nadia McDonald.

Along with authors such as Chuck Klosterman, Morgan Jerkins, Omar El Akkad, Matt Haig, and Tamara Winfrey Harris. Season 4 features more prominent musicians such as Portico Quartet, Dustin O'Halloran, Ben Folds, Jaymay, Au Revoir Simone, Fake Shark, Zola Jesus, The Bright Light Social Hour, and Shook Twins. Season 4 also includes a unique episode officially funded by a grant from the Regional Arts & Culture Council. The episode is a radio drama adaptation of playwright and screenwriter Brianna Barrett's historical fiction television pilot based on the life of Frances Fuller Victor, an American historian and novelist living in Civil War era San Francisco.

Season 5 was announced for 2022, bringing on Debbie Millman, Danté Stewart, Stephanie Foo, Tommy Davidson, Dan Chaon, Imogen Binnie, Daniel Olivas and more.

Production
Each episode begins with an introduction from Brewer, followed by a lofi theme or, as Brewer has likened it, "bedroom-pop". Following Brewer's introduction, the featured author will read an excerpt from their upcoming book, prize-winning essay, or debut work.

For the first 10 episodes, Brewer was responsible for the arrangement and sound design, excluding episode 2 with Lidia Yuknavitch which was scored, arranged, and mixed entirely by Jake Whiston. Season 2 brought on regular contributor Tim Karplus as Storybound'''s Head Mixing Engineer, as season 3 marked a tonal change for the show, incorporating more experimental cross-genre music compositions with sampling created and arranged by Brewer. This notable musical shift followed Brewer wanting "to take on more of a defined shape as [they began] understanding [their] place within the dramatic podcast community".

Acclaimed non-profit Electric Literature covered Storybound'' in its Top 10 for podcasts "to listen to if you miss life before Quarantine", noting, "[Listen] if you miss: Going to the movie theater, sitting in a comfy seat, eating popcorn, and listening to other theatergoers murmur in the dark."

Season 5 marked a departure for the show's format, splicing conversations between Brewer and the guests alongside their readings.

Episodes

Season 1 (2019)

Season 2 (2020)

Season 3 (2020)

Season 4 (2021)

Season 5 (2022)

See also 

 Music podcast

References

External links
 Official website

Audio podcasts
2019 podcast debuts
Arts podcasts
Music podcasts